Childerditch is a settlement and former civil parish now in the unparished area of Brentwood, in the Brentwood district, in the county of Essex, England. It forms part of the Warley borough council ward. In 1931 the parish had a population of 184. On 1 April 1934 the parish was abolished and merged with Brentwood, part also went to Little Burstead.

Childerditch church is a landmark on a hilltop to the north of the A127 road. The church is dedicated to All Saints and St Faith. It was constructed in 1869, to the designs of D. C. Nicholls and Fred Johnstone.

References

Sources
 

Villages in Essex
Former civil parishes in Essex
Brentwood (Essex town)